Futebol Clube Castrense is a Portuguese football club located in Castro Verde, Portugal.

Colours and badge 
Castrense's colours are green and black.

External links 
 Official website
 Soccerway Profile
 FPF Profile
 Fora de Jogo Profile

Football clubs in Portugal
Association football clubs established in 1953
1953 establishments in Portugal